Bernard Koku Avle also known as Bernardino Koku Avle (born 20 May 1981) is a Ghanaian media personality, broadcast journalist, public speaker. He is the current host of Citi FM's morning show The Citi Breakfast Show and the host of the Point Of  View Show on Citi TV.  He also moderates and facilitates local and international conferences occasionally.

Education
He completed his basic education at the University of Ghana Primary School Legon. He went to the Presbyterian Boys' Senior High School for his secondary education. He then got admission into the University of Ghana, Legon where he obtained a Bachelors of Arts in Economics with distinction. He further went to the Warwick Business School in the UK as a Chevening Scholar  to obtain his MBA in Marketing.

Career 
He is a broadcast journalist and also General manager at Citi FM, one of Ghana's most influential radio stations. He is also a member of the governing council of the Global Marketing Network in Ghana.

Galamsey

In 2017, Bernard Avle together with Citi Fm launched a campaign against illegal small scale mining also known as Galamsey which has destroyed Ghana's water bodies over the years. The Ghana Chamber of Mines gave his show an excellence award for the work he did for Galamsey. In May 2020, Bernard Avle expressed worry at the number of people permitted by the Ministry of Information to address the public in their regular press briefings.

Personal life 
Bernard Avle was married to the late Justine Avle with four children. The couple tied the knot in 2011.

Awards 
Here are some awards his shows have won: 

 
|-

|-
|| 2015  ||| Citi Breakfast Show || Chartered Institute of Marketing Ghana (CIMG) Radio Programme of the Year ||  
|-
|| 2013  ||| Citi Breakfast Show || Chartered Institute of Marketing Ghana (CIMG) Radio Programme of the Year ||  
|-
|| 2007 ||| Citi Breakfast Show  || BBC Africa Radio Awards Interactive/Talk Show of the Year || 
|-
|| 2018 ||| Bernard Avle || Ghana Journalists Association (Journalist of The Year – 2017) || 
|-
|| 2018 ||| Citi Breakfast Show  || Ghana Journalists Association (Best Radio Morning Show – 2017) || 
|-
|| 2019 ||| Citi Breakfast Show  || Ghana Journalists Association (Best Radio Morning Show – 2018) || 
|-
|| 2019 ||| Citi FM  || Ghana Journalists Association (Best Radio Station (English) – 2018) || 
|}

References

External links 
 
 Bernard Avle on LinkedIn

1981 births
Living people
Ewe people
Ghanaian journalists
Presbyterian Boys' Senior High School alumni
University of Ghana alumni
Alumni of the University of Warwick